The 1350s was a decade of the Julian Calendar which began on January 1, 1350, and ended on December 31, 1359.

Significant people

References